Claudia Kohde-Kilsch and Helena Suková were the defending champions but lost in the quarterfinals to Elise Burgin and Rosalyn Fairbank.

Martina Navratilova and Pam Shriver won in the final 6–4, 3–6, 6–3 against Hana Mandlíková and Wendy Turnbull.

Seeds 
Champion seeds are indicated in bold text while text in italics indicates the round in which those seeds were eliminated.

Draw

Finals

Top half

Section 1

Section 2

Bottom half

Section 3

Section 4

External links 
1986 US Open – Women's draws and results at the International Tennis Federation

Women's Doubles
US Open (tennis) by year – Women's doubles
1986 in women's tennis
1986 in American women's sports